Anton Frederik Winter Jakhelln Prytz (14 February 1878 – 19 February 1945) was a Norwegian politician.

Prytz was born in Oslo. He was minister of finance in the NS government of Vidkun Quisling 1942–1945. Prytz died from cancer before the end of war.

He was the brother of Milda Dorothea Prytz.

References 

1878 births
1945 deaths
Politicians from Oslo
Norwegian Army personnel
Members of Nasjonal Samling
Government ministers of Norway